Survivor: Micronesia – Fans vs. Favorites, also known as Survivor: Fans vs. Favorites and Survivor: Micronesia, is the sixteenth season of the American CBS competitive reality television series Survivor. It is the show's third season to include contestants from past seasons, after the all-returning contestant pool from Survivor: All-Stars, along with Survivor: Guatemala, in which two contestants from Survivor: Palau returned for a second chance. 

The season was filmed in Palau, marking the second time Survivor had filmed there (the first being 2005). The filming locations for this season were the same as those used in Survivor: Palau, with Airai living in the former Koror camp and Malakal living in the former Ulong camp. Exile Island returned this season after being absent from Survivor: China, with a new twist of one castaway from each tribe being sent to Exile Island where they competed to find the hidden immunity idol. 

The full cast of 20 contestants was revealed on January 3, 2008, by Entertainment Weekly. For the first time since Survivor: Panama, the final Tribal Council featured two rather than three finalists. This was also the first season to feature an even-numbered jury, with eight jurors rather than the usual seven or nine.

In the end, Parvati Shallow defeated fellow Favorite Amanda Kimmel by a vote of 5–3 to become the Sole Survivor. The viewers' favorite contestants, as named on the reunion show, were James Clement, Kimmel and Oscar "Ozzy" Lusth. The season has been considered one of the show's best, with the blindside elimination of fifth-place contestant Erik Reichenbach by the four remaining female survivors – Parvati, Amanda, Cirie Fields and Natalie Bolton – as the series' best event.

Contestants

The contestants included ten new players, the Fans, and ten former players, the Favorites, from six previous seasons returning for their second chance at the game. The Fans were initially on the Airai tribe, with the Favorites on Malakal; both tribes were named after locations in Palau. The merged tribe was named Dabu by contestant Erik Reichenbach, who falsely claimed it to mean "good" in Micronesian.

Future appearances
Parvati Shallow, Amanda Kimmel, James Clement and Cirie Fields returned to play Survivor for a third time in Survivor: Heroes vs. Villains. Ozzy Lusth returned to play a third time on Survivor: South Pacific. Both Fields and Lusth also returned for their fourth time each on Survivor: Game Changers. Jonathan Penner returned for his third time on Survivor: Philippines. Erik Reichenbach is at this time the only Fan returning as he was a Favorite in the second "Fans vs. Favorites" season, Survivor: Caramoan. Shallow later returned to compete on Survivor: Winners at War.

Outside of Survivor, Lusth competed on the second season of American Ninja Warrior. Eliza Orlins competed in The Amazing Race 31 alongside two-time Survivor contestant Corinne Kaplan. Fields was a contestant on the USA Network reality competition series Snake in the Grass. She also competed on the Peacock reality TV series The Traitors.

Season summary
This season pitted a tribe of "Favorites", ten returning Survivor contestants, against a tribe of "Fans", ten new players. The Favorites tribe was run by a majority alliance of Amanda, Cirie, Parvati, James, and Ozzy, while the Fans failed to form consistent alliances. After four eliminations, with the tribes still at equal numbers, the tribes were swapped through a schoolyard pick. On both tribes, the Favorites worked to eliminate the Fans, who continued to succumb to infighting. 

After the merge, the remaining Fans attempted to form alliances with the Favorites that held the majority. A core alliance of Amanda, Parvati and Cirie worked with female Fans Natalie and Alexis to blindside several threats, working covertly to avoid suspicion and advancing to the final six with Erik, who had been safeguarded by repeated immunity challenge wins. Amanda was targeted for being a threat after Erik won immunity again; she saved herself with a hidden immunity idol and Alexis was eliminated. Erik won immunity yet again, but the others convinced him he was safe regardless; he gave the necklace to Natalie in an attempt to gain her trust, and the women promptly voted him off. 

Amanda, Cirie and Parvati achieved their goal of becoming the final three, but were surprised by one last immunity challenge and elimination; Amanda won the challenge and eliminated Cirie, who she perceived to be the greater threat to win. The jury intensely questioned both finalists and awarded Parvati the victory in a 5–3 decision.

In the case of multiple tribes or castaways who win a reward or immunity, they are listed in order of finish, or alphabetically where it was a team effort; where one castaway won and invited others, the invitees are in brackets.

Episodes

Voting history

Reception
This season received universal acclaim from both fans and critics, and is generally considered one of the best seasons of the show. Jeff Probst originally ranked it as his second-favorite season of all time (behind Borneo), stating that "The Parvati-led women's alliance produced some of the most memorable moments in the history of the show." Probst also stated that the Tribal Council in which Erik Reichenbach was eliminated was his favorite of all the seasons, and that Palau was his favorite filming location. Survivor columnist Dalton Ross of Entertainment Weekly also rated the season as the second-best season, saying that it had "great characters and the perfect mix of solid and stupid gameplay." He later ranked this season and Borneo as tied for the best seasons, saying,

Ross, in a 2019 Entertainment Weekly oral history discussion of Erik's elimination episode, named the resulting blindside as the greatest Survivor moment in the show's history.

Slant magazine gave the season a 3.5-star rating out of 4, saying "Never in Survivor history has there been such a string of shocking tribal councils one right after the next." Andy Dehnart of reality blurred also gave the season a positive review, stating that the moment where Erik gave individual immunity to Natalie helped make "Survivor: Micronesia the best season ever—or at least, the best second half of a season ever." In 2014, Joe Reid of The Wire ranked it as the sixth-best season of the series. Survivor fan site "Survivor Oz" ranked Micronesia as the second-best season of the series (behind Heroes vs. Villains) in its annual polls in 2012 and 2013, while it was ranked fourth in 2014 and fifth in 2015. "The Purple Rock Podcast" ranked it as the fifth-best season. In 2015, in a poll held on the website of former Survivor contestant Rob Cesternino, Micronesia was ranked as the fourth-greatest season of the series by the website's users, while Cesternino himself personally ranked it as the second-best season, behind Survivor: Heroes vs. Villains. This was updated in 2021 during Cesternino's podcast, Survivor All-Time Top 40 Rankings, ranking 4th out of 40. In 2020, Inside Survivor ranked this season 7th out of 40, calling it a "strong season from start to finish with a few bumps along the way".

In the official CBS Watch issue commemorating Survivors 15th anniversary, Micronesia was voted by viewers as the third-greatest season of the series, behind Heroes vs. Villains and Pearl Islands. Three of the top ten contestants voted by viewers as the greatest were in this season (Lusth, Fields, and Shallow). Another poll in the same magazine, asking viewers to vote for the most memorable moment in the series, saw Ozzy's elimination in episode ten come in second, behind Sandra Diaz-Twine burning Russell Hantz's hat in Heroes vs. Villains.

The gameplay of Shallow was very well-received by fans and critics alike. In the official issue of CBS Watch commemorating the 15th anniversary of Survivor, Shallow was voted by viewers as the fourth greatest contestant in the history of the series (only behind Rob Cesternino, Russell Hantz, and Rob Mariano), and was the highest-ranking female contestant. In 2017, Entertainment Weekly had fans of the series rank the 34 winners and Shallow came in 1st place. In 2015, host Jeff Probst named Shallow one of his top ten favorite Survivor winners, and one of his top four favorite female winners. In 2020, before the premiere of Winners at War, Probst named Shallow the best winner ever.

References

External links
 Official CBS Survivor Micronesia Website

2008 American television seasons
2007 in Palau
16
Television shows set in Palau
Television shows filmed in Palau
Television shows filmed in the Federated States of Micronesia